Ocean Park is a  Santa Monica neighborhood of Santa Monica, California within the Westside region of Los Angeles County, California, United States.

Ocean Park Neighborhood

The Ocean Park neighborhood is in the southwest corner of Santa Monica. The area is bordered by the beach to Lincoln Boulevard and between Pico Boulevard and Venice on the south. The Ocean Park beach is popular with sunbathers, surfers, and volleyball players. Joggers and bikers use a beachside path, while parks offer playgrounds and picnicking, and restaurants are on Main Street. The area has apartments and Craftsman bungalows, and the California Heritage Museum, in a Victorian home, shows modern art and hosts a weekly gathering of food trucks. 

This neighborhood has a mix of smaller older homes, apartment buildings, large homes near the beach and condos. Several condo towers are located along the beach. The area is like its neighbor Venice Beach. Many Santa Monica residents come to Main Street to shop at the boutiques and restaurants. Main Street also hosts a weekly farmer's market on Sundays. SMASH (an alternative school) and John Muir elementary schools are in the neighborhood, as well as Olympic High, an alternative high school, and Santa Monica High School are also located in the area. The neighborhood association is called the Ocean Park Association.

History 

Developer Abbot Kinney and Francis G. Ryan, of the firm Kinney & Ryan, acquired the deed to the coastal strip previously purchased by W. D. Vawter and named the area Ocean Park in May 1895. It became their first amusement park and residential project. A horse-racing track, pier and golf course were built near the Ocean Park Casino. Kinney convinced the Santa Fe Railroad to extend its Inglewood line north to his resort. When his partner Francis Ryan died in October 1898, his widow's new husband, Thomas H. Dudley, sold their half interest to a group of men known as Fraser, Gage and Merritt Jones. Kinney focused on the south end of the property, which he made into Venice of America. The Ocean Park post office was opened in July 1889 and the Ocean Park Fire Company in February 1900. In March 1902, the Ocean Park bank was organized by Thomas H. Dudley, Abbot Kinney, Martin Dudley and Plez James.

Ocean Park Branch Library

In December 1916, the commissioners of Santa Monica selected the site for the Ocean Park branch Carnegie library at 2601 Main Street. The library was funded by a $12,500 grant from the Carnegie Corporation. The library was completed on February 15, 1918 when it was opened to the public. The library is one of the remaining pieces of the Carnegie legacy in Southern California. During World War II, the basement of the library was converted to a Young People's room for teens. It served as a temporary United Service Organizations (USO) location during the war. The city Landmarks Commission designated it as a  Santa Monica historic landmark on May 3, 1977. 
 

On March 27, 1943, the  Aragon Ballroom opened for business. The Aragon Ballroom was on Lick Pier in the Ocean Park district. It was destroyed by fire on May 26, 1970.

See also 
 Aragon Ballroom (Ocean Park, Santa Monica, California)
 List of City of Santa Monica Designated Historic Landmarks
 History of Santa Monica, California

References

External links 
 
 Ocean Park Association 
 Santa Monica in Vintage Postcards

 
Cities in Los Angeles County, California
Populated coastal places in California
Seaside resorts in California
Westside (Los Angeles County)